Camp Loughridge (CL) is a non-profit, non-denominational Christian camp located in Sapulpa, Oklahoma.

Camp Loughridge's heritage and traditions began in 1959 at the site of the YWCA's Camp Parthenia, which was established in 1919 on the West campus. Today, in addition to traditional campers, Loughridge also serves economically disadvantaged children through scholarships. For many of these children, it is their first experience with a variety of activities such as hiking, swimming, canoeing, archery, challenge course and learning about nature.

In 2013, Tulsa People Magazine voted Camp Loughridge as Tulsa's A List Winner.

References 

"Autism Center of Tulsa." Summer Camps. Camp Loughridge Autism Inclusion Program, n.d. Web. 22 May 2015. <https://web.archive.org/web/20150529221230/http://www.autismtulsa.org/summer-camps>.

External links 
 Camp Loughridge

Loughridge